Brendan Austin Rodgers (born August 9, 1996) is an American professional baseball second baseman for the Colorado Rockies of Major League Baseball (MLB). He was drafted third overall by the Rockies in the 2015 MLB draft.

Early life 
Brendan Austin Rodgers was born on August 9, 1996, in Winter Park, Florida, to Greg and Julie Rodgers, owners of an apparel and promotions company. Rodgers' father and his two brothers both played soccer, and he only began playing baseball at the urging of a neighbor. He grew up playing on youth baseball teams with Bo Bichette, the son of Major League Baseball (MLB) player Dante Bichette, and when Rodgers was five years old, the elder Bichette told his parents that he had "a serious future in baseball". After playing second base during his first year at Lake Mary High School, Rodgers switched to shortstop for the next three seasons. During his senior season at Lake Mary, Rodgers batted .368 with eight home runs and 23 runs batted in (RBI). Outside of his high school team, Rodgers played for the Orlando Scorpions, a traveling team previously attended by Chris Sale, Zack Greinke, and Jonathan Lucroy.

Professional career

Draft and minor leagues 

The Colorado Rockies selected Rodgers out of high school with the third overall pick of the 2015 MLB Draft. He had previously committed to playing college baseball for the Florida State Seminoles, but he signed with the Rockies on June 17 for a $5.5 million signing bonus. After signing, Rodgers began his professional baseball career with the Grand Junction Rockies, a Rookie-level team in the Pioneer League. He played there for the entire 2015 season, batting .273 with three home runs and 20 RBI in 37 games and 143 at bats. Rodgers was promoted to the Low-A Asheville Tourists for the 2016 season, where he impressed manager Warren Schaeffer by batting .358 with seven home runs and 27 RBI through the first month of the South Atlantic League season. This included his first career grand slam on May 7 during a 16–7 Asheville victory over the Delmarva Shorebirds. He played 110 games in Asheville, batting .281 with 19 home runs and 73 RBI in 442 at bats.

He spent 2017 with both the Lancaster JetHawks and the Hartford Yard Goats, batting a combined .336 with 18 home runs, 64 RBIs and a .940 OPS in 89 games between both teams. In 2018, he played for both Hartford and the Albuquerque Isotopes, compiling a combined .268 batting average with 17 home runs and 67 RBIs in 114 games.

Colorado Rockies 
He opened the 2019 season back with Albuquerque. On May 17, his contract was selected and he was called up to the major leagues. He made his major league debut that night versus the Philadelphia Phillies.

Rodgers only appeared in 7 games in the pandemic shortened 2020 season for the Rockies, before landing on the injured list due to lingering problems in his right shoulder. In late 2021 Spring Training, Rodgers suffered a strained hamstring, requiring at least a month of recovery.

On June 1, 2022, Rodgers enjoyed his first career three home run game. His third home run in the contest was a walk-off home run off of Cole Sulser to defeat the Miami Marlins, 13-12. In 2022 he led the NL in double plays grounded into (25), and batted .266/.325/.408.

References

External links

1996 births
Living people
Sportspeople from Winter Park, Florida
People from Lake Mary, Florida
Sportspeople from Seminole County, Florida
Baseball players from Florida
Major League Baseball second basemen
Major League Baseball shortstops
Gold Glove Award winners
Colorado Rockies players
Grand Junction Rockies players
Asheville Tourists players
Lancaster JetHawks players
Hartford Yard Goats players
Albuquerque Isotopes players